Kalonymus Kalman Shapira (or Klonimus Kalmish Szapiro) (or "Shapiro," a more common transliteration of the Polish spelling of his name "Szapiro") (20 May 1889–3 November 1943), was the Grand Rabbi of Piaseczno, Poland, who authored a number of works and was murdered by the Nazis during the Holocaust.

Early years and life before the war

Kalonymus Kalman Shapira was born in Grodzisk Mazowiecki, Poland to his father, the Imrei Elimelech of Grodzhisk.  Named after his maternal great-grandfather, the renowned Maor VaShemesh, he was a scion of a distinguished family, which included Rabbi Elimelech of Lizhensk, the Chozeh of Lublin and the Maggid of Kozhnitz.

The Rebbe was born on the day after Lag BaOmer, 19 Iyar 5649, and his bris was on Yesod SheBeYesod of the Omer.

At the age of three, he was orphaned by the death of his father. In 1905 he married Rachel Chaya Miriam, daughter of his nephew Grand Rabbi Yerachmiel Moshe of Kozhnitz. She helped him prepare his lectures and books, even adding pertinent insights of her own. The couple had two children: a son, Elimelech Ben Zion, and a daughter, Rechil Yehudis, both of whom were also killed or murdered in the Holocaust.

In 1909 he was appointed rabbi of Piaseczno, near Warsaw, and subsequently attracted many hasidim. He was deeply focused on the education of children and young men, establishing the yeshiva Da'as Moshe in 1923, which became one of the largest Hasidic yeshivot in Warsaw between the wars.

Educational theories

In his work as a teacher, Rabbi Shapira attempted to reverse the trend toward secularization, which swept the Jewish community in Poland between the wars. The vibrant cultural life of the city, as well as the attractions of political movements such as Zionism and Socialism, eroded the number of students wishing to pursue a yeshiva education. These trends, Rabbi Shapira argued, could only be exacerbated by traditional educational methods, firm discipline and rote learning, such as were often the practice of the day in yeshivot. According to Rabbi Nehemia Polen (a noted expert on Rabbi Shapira's work) in his most important work,  Chovas haTalmidim  (“The Students’ Responsibility”), Rabbi Shapira argued that a child must be imbued “with a vision of his own potential greatness” and be enlisted “as an active participant in his own development.” Likewise, teachers “must learn to speak the language of the student, and graphically convey the delights of a life of closeness to G-d.”. Rabbi Shapira argued for positive, psychologically sensitive, joyous educational methods.

It is important to emphasize that R. Shapira's educational philosophy was not only a response to the crisis of secularization among the youth. Rather, it should also be seen as an organic component of his entire Hasidic outlook and as part of his vision to revitalize all of Hasidic society.

Some similarities had been pointed out between these ideas and the educational ideas set out on a non-religious basis, in much the same years, by Janusz Korczak.

War years

Rabbi Shapira's only son, his daughter-in-law, and his sister-in-law were killed during the Nazi aerial bombing of Warsaw in September 1939. After the invasion of Poland, Rabbi Shapira was interned with a few of his Hasidim in the Warsaw Ghetto, where he ran a secret synagogue. He invested enormous efforts in maintaining Jewish life in the ghetto, including arranging for mikveh immersions and kosher marriages. Rabbi Shapira was able to survive in the ghetto until its liquidation, avoiding the tragic deportations to Treblinka in the summer of 1942, because of the support of the Judenrat. Like other notables, he was given work at Schultz's shoe factory—a path to ongoing survival.

Rabbi Shapira is especially well known because of a book he wrote while in the ghetto. The book, which is a compilation of weekly sermons to his students, contends with complex questions of faith in the face of the mounting suffering of the Jews in the ghetto. When it became apparent to Rabbi Shapira that the end of the ghetto and all its inhabitants were near, he transferred this book and other manuscripts to the Ringelblum "Oneg Shabbat" Archive. They were buried with other documents in a large milk canister which was found by a construction worker after the end of the war. The book, originally simply entitled "Torah Innovations from the years 5700-5702," was published in Israel in 1960 under the title *Esh Kodesh* ("Sacred Fire"). Daniel Reiser republished it in a two volume critical edition, "Sermons from the Years of Rage", in 2017.

After the Warsaw Ghetto Uprising was crushed in 1943, Rabbi Shapira was taken to the Trawniki work camp near Lublin. Although offered the opportunity to escape from the concentration camp, he apparently refused. Following the Jewish uprising in the Treblinka death camp (August 2, 1943) and in Sobibor extermination camp (October 14, 1943), there was increasing concern among the Nazi authorities that there would be further outbreaks of violence at other concentration camps. For this reason, Aktion Erntefest (Operation Harvest Festival) was launched. During this operation, carried out on November 3, 1943, all the remaining Jews in Trawniki, including Rabbi Shapira, were shot to death.

Ideas

Rabbi Shapira's memory is revered, and he is held as an example of faith under enormous duress. Orthodox Jewish thinkers, however, have not always been comfortable with his opinions. In his article about this issue, Amos Goldberg states that other, more traditional portrayals of the Holocaust in Orthodox writings tend to dwell on the miraculous survival of famous rabbis and on the strength of the faith of Jews in Nazi-occupied Europe despite their suffering. In contrast, Shapira does not shy away from describing the deterioration of faith in the ghetto. This should not be surprising in light of the fact that he wrote openly of the deterioration of faith and observance even before the beginning of the war. He also wrestles with the difficulty of continued faith in G-d's justice under such circumstances, drawing answers from Kabbalah and other Jewish sources. It is important to note, however, that despite these intellectual and emotional struggles, Rabbi Shapira's faith remained strong and unwavering and he continued to inspire others to the end of his life.

Works
Chovas HaTalmidim (The Students' Obligation) - a collection of essays aimed at teenagers which has become a standard textbook in yeshivos. It was first published in Warsaw in 1932.
Hachshoras HaAvreichim (Preparation of Young Men) - a work written for young married men as a sequel to Chovas HaTalmidim. It was published from a manuscript buried in the ghetto. (Jewish Spiritual Growth - a translation of Hachshoras HaAvreichim by Yaacov David Shulman)
Mevo haSheorim - Both the continuation of Hachshoras HaAvreichim and intended to be the introduction to Chovas HaAvreichim, which was to have been the final book in the series on education and spiritual guidance. Only Mevo HaSheorim survived from this manuscript, buried in the ghetto. According to Daniel Reiser, the manuscript of Chovas HaAvreichim wasn't lost, rather Rabbi Shapira didn't have a chance to compose it before the Second World War, other than the brief section published in Derech HaMelech.
Tzav V'Ziruz - Rabbi Shapira's personal diary, translated into English as To Heal the Soul: The Spiritual Journey of a Chasidic Rebbe. It was also published from a manuscript buried in the ghetto. 
Bnei Machshava Tova (Conscious Community: A Guide to Inner Work) was originally distributed by Rabbi Shapira to his closest Hasidim in the early 1920s as a secret handbook for the establishment of secret mystical fraternities.  The book is a guide to attaining spirituality via a variety of spiritual and mystical techniques including guided imagery meditation in a group setting. Translated and with an introduction by Rabbi Andrea Cohen-Kiener.ISBN/978-0-7657-6091-3 
Derech HaMelech (The Way of the King --- also, idiomatically, "the high road" in modern Hebrew) - Torah discourses that were spoken on Shabbos and Yom Tov during the 1920s and 1930s. The text is based upon copies of the sermons made by Rabbi Shapira's followers. It also includes letters, documents and other writings such as the only surviving chapters from his projected work Chovas  HaAvreichim and his commentary on the Zohar. It also includes a description of his original "hashkata" (mind-quieting) meditation technique. 
Aish Kodesh (Holy Fire) - his inspirational speeches given during the Holocaust period. (A Critical and Annotated Edition of Rabbi Kalonymus Kalman Shapira’s Sermons during the Holocaust 2 Vol. 630 pp.)

Legacy

Israel
The current Rebbe of Piaseczno is Rabbi Kalman Menachem Shapira, a great-nephew of the first Rebbe, Klonimous Kalman. Rabbi Kalman Menachem resides in Ramat Beit Shemesh, Israel and leads Congregation Aish Kodesh, which is both a synagogue and the worldwide headquarters for spreading the teachings of his great-uncle. Study halls named Aish Kodesh are also located in Moshav Mevo Modi'im, Beitar Illit and in Bnei Brak. There is a yeshiva in Baka, Jerusalem called Yeshivat Chovat Hatalmidim, where students under the helm of Rabbi Yair HaLevi learn the legendary teachings of The Piaseczna Rabbi. In Samaria there is a small settlement named "Aish Kodesh". It was established in memory of Aish Kodesh Gilmore, who was killed in a terrorist attack by the PLO on October 30, 2000 during the Second Intifada.

United States
Congregation Aish Kodesh, founded in 1992 and dedicated to the memory and teachings of Rabbi Shapira, is the first synagogue to call itself by that name. Led by Rabbi Moshe Weinberger, the neo-Hasidic synagogue is located in Woodmere, Long Island, New York. There is also a yeshiva called Aish Kodesh in Virginia.

There is also a synagogue in Boulder, Colorado, founded in 2000, named Aish Kodesh. It was led by Rabbi Gavriel Goldfeder for ten years between 2003 and 2013. There is a recently founded synagogue in Manchester England named Aish Kodesh.

Europe 
In 2010, the first synagogue in Post-holocaust Europe was opened under the name Adass Aish Kodesh and is led by Rabbi Y. Reuven Rubin, formerly of South Manchester Synagogue.

Further reading
Nehemia Polen: Divine Weeping. Rabbi Kalonymos Shapiro's Theology of Catastrophe in the Warsaw Ghetto, in : Modern Judaism 7 (1987) 253-269; 

Nehamia Polen: The Holy Fire:  The Teachings of Rabbi Kalonymus Kalman Shapira, the Rebbe of the Warsaw Ghetto.  Northvale, NJ: Jason Aronson Press, 1999. 

Isaac Hershkowitz: Rabbi Kalonymus Kalmish Shapiro, the Piasechner Rebbe: His Holocaust and pre-Holocaust Thought, Continuity or Discontinuity?, M.A. Thesis, Bar-Ilan University, Ramat-Gan, Israel (2004).

Rabbi Shapira appears as a major character in Joseph Skibell's 2010 novel A Curable Romantic.

Moshe Weinberger; "Warmed by the Fire of the Aish Kodesh : Torah from the Hilulas of Reb Kalonymus Kalman Shapira of Piaseczna", Adapted by Benjamin Wolf. Jerusalem, Feldheim Publishers, 2015.

External links
Video lecture on Rabbi Kalonymus Kalman Shapira by Dr. Henry Abramson
Lectures on Chovat HaTalmidim by Rav Ari Shames at Midreshet HaRova in mp3
Article about Grand Rabbi Shapira
English Translation of introductory chapter of Chovat Hatalmidim - Message to Teachers and Parents
Selections from Sefer Aish Kodesh in Hebrew - PDF file
'Sefer Chovas HaTalmidim in Hebrew - PDF file] and Sefer Chovas HaTalmidim, edition 1975 in Yiddish - PDF file
Aish Kodesh Shiurim - Weekly parsha classes from the Aish Kodesh taught by Rabbi Henoch Dov Hoffman [mp3 Audio files]
Avichai Zur, "“The Lord Hides in Inner Chambers”:The Doctrine of Suffering in the Theosophy of Rabbi Kalonymus Kalman Shapira of Piaseczno", Dapim - Studies on the Shoa'', 2011 ( Vol. 25), pp. 183–237. [https://www.scribd.com/doc/58244940/%D7%98%D7%A8%D7%90%D7%95%D7%9E%D7%94-%D7%9E%D7%A9%D7%91%D7%A8-%D7%95%D7%A6%D7%9E%D7%A6%D7%95%D7%9D-%D7%91%D7%AA%D7%95%D7%A8%D7%AA-%D7%94%D7%90%D7%93%D7%9E%D7%95%D7%A8-%D7%9E%D7%A4%D7%99%D7%90%D7%A1%D7%A6%D7%A0%D7%94 Hebrew version.
Zvi Leshem: "Between Messianism and Prophecy: Hasidism according to the Piaseczner Rebbe" Hebrew PhD dissertation: 
Zvi Leshem, "I Beg and Plead with Every Jew to Study my Books"
Zvi Leshem, "Guided Imagery Techniques in the Piaseczner Rebbe and R. Menachem Ekstein"] (Hebrew) 
Zvi Leshem, "Emotional Hasidic Education as a response to Secularization in the Writings of R. K. K. Shapira of Piaseczna" (Hebrew)
Zvi Leshem, "The Light in the Walls of the Vessels: Service through Corporality in the Thought of R. K. K. Shapira of Piaseczna" (Hebrew)
Zvi Leshem, "Visualizing God to Achieve Intention and Cleaving during Prayer as part of the Hasidic Vision of R. K. K. Shapira of Piaseczna" (Hebrew) 
Zvi Leshem, "Pouring Out Your Heart: Rabbi Nachman’s Hitbodedut And Its Piaseczner Reverberations"
Chen Malul, "The Mystical Notebook that Teaches how to Restore Prophecy" (Hebrew)
 Daniel Reiser, "To Rend the Entire Veil": Prophecy in the Teachings of Rabbi Kalonymous Kalman Shapira of Piazecna and its Renewal in the Twentieth Century, Modern Judaism 34, 3 (2014), pp. 334–352.
 Daniel Reiser, Vision as a Mirror: Imagery Techniques in Twentieth Century Jewish Mysticism (In Hebrew), Los Angeles: Cherub-Press 2014, pp. 105–224.
 Daniel Reiser, "Historicism and/or Phenomenology in The Study Of Jewish Mysticism: Imagery Techniques in the Teachings of Rabbi Kalonymus Kalman Shapira as a Case Study," Modern Judaism 36, 1 (2016), pp. 1–16
 Daniel Reiser, "  Esh Kodesh: A New Evaluation in Light of a Philological Examination of the Manuscript, Yad Vashem Studies 44, 1 (2016), pp. 65–97
Niggun (song) by 'Derech Achim' in memory of the Piaseczno Rebba

References

1889 births
1943 deaths
Hasidic rebbes
Hasidic rabbis in Europe
Polish Hasidic rabbis
Polish civilians killed in World War II
Polish Jews who died in the Holocaust
People who died in Trawniki concentration camp
Warsaw Ghetto inmates
Deaths by firearm in Poland
People from Grodzisk Mazowiecki
Polish people executed in Nazi concentration camps
People executed by Nazi Germany by firearm
Executed people from Masovian Voivodeship
Kozhnitz (Hasidic dynasty)